Tajan Lateh-ye Sofla (also Romanized as Tajan Lateh-ye Soflá) is a village in Gahrbaran-e Shomali Rural District, Gahrbaran District, Miandorud County, Mazandaran Province, Iran. At the 2006 census, its population was 376, in 86 families.

References 

Populated places in Miandorud County